Hygromycin B 4-O-kinase (hygromycin-B kinase) is an enzyme with systematic name ATP:hygromycin-B 4-O-phosphotransferase. This enzyme catalyses the following chemical reaction

 ATP + hygromycin B  ADP + 4-O-phosphohygromycin B

Phosphorylates the antibiotic hygromycin B.

References

External links 
 

EC 2.7.1